Belvedere di Spinello is a comune and town in the province of Crotone, in Calabria, southern Italy. The settlement has historically been inhabited by an Arbëreshë community, which now has assimilated.
It is formed by two separate villages, Belvedere and Spinello, unified into a single commune in 1863.

Twin towns
 Rho, Italy, since 2014
 Erding, Germany, since 2014

Sources

 

Arbëresh settlements 

Cities and towns in Calabria